Kumar Kaibarta Gaon is a census town in Jorhat district in the Indian state of Assam.

Demographics
 India census, Kumar Kaibarta Gaon had a population of 6345. Males constitute 53% of the population and females 47%. Kumar Kaibarta Gaon has an average literacy rate of 81%, higher than the national average of 59.5%: male literacy is 86%, and female literacy is 76%. In Kumar Kaibarta Gaon, 8% of the population is under 6 years of age.

References

Cities and towns in Jorhat district
Jorhat